Angelo Antonino Pipitone (born August 30, 1943 in Carini, Sicily) is a member of the Sicilian Mafia from Carini near Palermo. Pipitone is the boss of the cosca of Carini and was arrested on September 25, 2014 together with his wife Franca Pellerito, his daughter Epifania and her husband Benedetto Pipitone, his cousin Francesco Marco Pipitone as well as Angela Conigliaro, who according to the investigators is loyal to the Pipitone family.

References

External links
Colpo alla famiglia mafiosa di Carini, blitz all’alba con 6 arresti, Giornale di Sicilia, September 25, 2014
Colpo alla cosca di Carini: ecco chi sono i coinvolti Le rivelazioni di Gaspare Pulizzi, Giornale di Sicilia, September 25, 2014
Decapitato il clan Pipitone a Carini, sei arresti e sequestro da 8 milioni, La Repubblica, September 25, 2014
Palermo, arrestato il boss Angelo Pipitone, Si24news, September 25, 2014

1943 births
Living people
Gangsters from the Province of Palermo
Sicilian mafiosi